Adna Romanza Chaffee (April 14, 1842 – November 1, 1914) was a lieutenant general in the United States Army. Chaffee took part in the American Civil War and Indian Wars, played a key role in the Spanish–American War, and fought in the Boxer Rebellion in China. He was the Chief of Staff of the United States Army from 1904 to 1906, overseeing far-reaching transformation of organization and doctrine in the army.

Early life and Civil War
Chaffee was born in Orwell, Ohio. When the American Civil War broke out in July 1861, Chaffee enlisted in the Union Army as a private in the U.S. 6th Cavalry Regiment. In 1862, Chaffee was promoted to sergeant and took part in the Peninsular Campaign and the Battle of Antietam. In September of that year he was made the first sergeant of Company K. He was commissioned as a second lieutenant in May 1863. His 6th Cavalry, on detached service from General John Buford's 1st Union Cavalry Division, though outnumbered attacked a Confederate Cavalry regiment at Fairfield, Pennsylvania, just outside Gettysburg on July 3, 1863 (source, Wittenberg, Eric: Gettysburg: Forgotten Cavalry Actions). In the ensuing action he was wounded and briefly held a prisoner of the Confederates. He served with the 6th Cavalry for the remainder of the war, being twice wounded. In February 1865, he was promoted to first lieutenant. For his "gallant and meritorious" actions in the Battle of Dinwiddie Court House he was brevetted captain.

After the war, Chaffee became a member of the Military Order of the Loyal Legion of the United States.

Indian Wars
Chaffee decided to remain with the army after the war. He was posted to the western frontier, and was promoted to captain of Regulars in October 1867. For the next thirty years he served in the Indian Wars, fighting the Central Plains and Southwestern tribes. In 1868, he was brevetted major for his actions at Paint Creek, Texas. In the following years he engaged the Indians many times, most notably at Red River, Texas, in 1874, and Big Dry Wash, Arizona, in 1882, for which he was brevetted lieutenant colonel.

In July 1888 he was promoted to major and transferred to the 9th Cavalry. From 1894 to 1896, he was an instructor of tactics at the Army's Infantry and Cavalry School at Fort Leavenworth. In June 1897 he was promoted to colonel and transferred to the 3rd Cavalry, where he served as commandant of the Cavalry School at Fort Riley until 1898.

Spanish–American War
With the outbreak of the Spanish–American War in 1898, Chaffee was assigned a brigade and was promoted to brigadier general of volunteers in May of that year, and in July after the victory at El Caney, to major general of volunteers. From late 1898 to May 1900, he served as the chief of staff to the military governor of Cuba, General Leonard Wood, being promoted to colonel of regulars in May 1899. He was a member of Society of the Army of Santiago, a military society for officers who had served in Cuba.

Boxer Rebellion
In June 1900, the Boxer Rebellion broke out in China. Colonel Chaffee was sent to China in July as the commander of the U.S. Army's China Relief Expedition. The Expedition was a part of the international force sent to rescue Western citizens and put down the rebellion. Chaffee participated in the Gaselee Expedition and subsequently the Battle of Peking, in which the legations were relieved. In 1900-1901 American forces were included in the Allied occupation of Peking (Beijing). As American commander Chaffee began public health, relief, and police operations in cooperation with Chinese officials. Chaffee concluded that Asiatics respected only the superior power. Reassigned to the Philippines he applied the lessons there, combining benevolence and public health measures with force and cooperation with local officials.

Chaffee was one of the founders of the Military Order of the Dragon, a military society for officers who had served in China during the Boxer Rebellion. He served as the society's president from its founding in 1900 until his death.

Later military service
In February 1901, he was promoted to major general in the Regular Army. From July of that year until October 1902, he served as the military governor of the Philippines. This included the beginning of the second phase of the Philippine–American War. In October 1902, he became commander of the Department of the East, a position he held until October 1903.

In January 1904, he was promoted to lieutenant general and, from January 9, 1904, until January 14, 1906, served as the Chief of Staff of the United States Army. At his own request, he was retired on February 1, 1906.

General Chaffee was invested with the Grand Cross of the Legion of Honor by the president of France.

In his retirement, he moved to Los Angeles, where he was appointed president of the Board of Public Works for the city of Los Angeles.

Family

Chaffee was married twice; in September 1867 he married Kate Haynie Reynolds, a young widow who died two and a half years later.

In 1875, he married Annie Frances Rockwell. Their son Adna R. Chaffee Jr. also became a general and was one of the fathers of the U.S. Army's armored forces, having a light tank, the M24 Chaffee, named in his honor.

Awards
Civil War Campaign Medal
Indian Campaign Medal
Spanish Campaign Medal
China Campaign Medal
Philippine Campaign Medal

Dates of rank

Tributes
A historical marker documenting Chaffee's birthplace stands in Orwell, Ohio.
 
The city of Chaffee, Missouri, was named in his honor when founded in 1905.

References

External links

 Men of Mark in America (1905 book) 
 Arlington National Cemetery

1842 births
1914 deaths
People from Orwell, Ohio
Union Army officers
American military personnel of the Spanish–American War
American military personnel of the Philippine–American War
United States Army Chiefs of Staff
American military personnel of the Boxer Rebellion
American people of the Indian Wars
People of Ohio in the American Civil War
Burials at Arlington National Cemetery
United States Army generals
Military Governors of the Philippine Islands